Ollie Hoskins may refer to:
 Ollie Hoskins, lead singer of The Dixie Nightingales
 Ollie Hoskins (rugby union), Australian rugby union player